Al-Mutawakkil Yahya Sharaf ad-Din (25 February 1473 – 27 March 1555) was an imam of the Zaidi state in Yemen. His period as imam covered the period from 1506 to 1555, though his political power ended in about 1547.

Construction of a new Zaidi realm
Yahya Sharaf ad-Din bin Shams ad-Din bin Ahmad was a grandson of the Imam al-Mahdi Ahmad bin Yahya (d. 1436) and was born in north-western Yemen. He spent several years in study to become a mujtahid (a man of Zaidi religious learning) and then proclaimed his da'wa (call for the imamate) in September 1506. At this time there was another imam in the Yemeni highlands, an-Nasir al-Hasan, who was, however, more a man of letters than a politician. The Tahiride Dynasty ruled the lowlands and southern highlands from Ta'izz, and had recently sacked the Zaidi capital San'a. However, the Tahirids were defeated by the Mamluks from Egypt in 1517 and the Sultan Amir was killed. Shortly afterwards, the Mamluk sultanate in Egypt was in turn defeated by the Ottoman Sultan Selim I. The Mamluk troops in Yemen, as a consequence, had to acknowledge the overlordship of Selim. The weak garrison in San'a had to withdraw, and the important city was taken over by al-Mutawakkil Yahya Sharaf ad-Din. The imam proceeded to expand the territory of the Zaidi imamate at the expense of various Tahiride princes who still ruled over scattered domains. Ta'izz was taken in 1534, followed by Khanfar, Lahij and Abyan. The Imam persecuted the Taiyabi Ismaili community in Yemen. See Mohammad Ezzuddin for further information.

Ottoman intervention

After three decades of struggles, al-Mutawakkil Yahya Sharaf ad-Din was able to impose his authority over the most of the Zaidi communities in Yemen, together with several Sunni areas. The imam was assisted by his sons, in particular al-Mutahhar. He thus resurrected the Zaidi imamate after a long period of disunity and much of the southern highlands and northern Tihamah was brought under his control. However, the Ottoman Turks had a vital interest in securing Yemen, which was described as being "more flourishing than the province of Egypt". At this time the Portuguese seafarers had become a nuisance in the Indian Ocean region, threatening to cut off trade between the Red Sea and the Indian coast. There were therefore good strategical reasons to control south-western Arabia. An Ottoman expedition established a small enclave in Zabid in 1539, but their little enclave was contained by the imam's forces for eight years. However, dissension within the imam's immediate family played into the Turks' hands. His ablest son, al-Mutahhar, even urged the Ottoman commander in Zabid to attack the lands of the imam.

Withdrawing from rulership

In 1547, when a new Turkish military onslaught began, al-Mutawakkil Yahya Sharaf ad-Din had to ask his son al-Mutahhar for support. From that date, Al-Mutahhar took over from his ageing father and struck coins in his own name. The Turkish advance could not be stopped, however. Udzimir Pasha took San'a through treachery in the same year and 1,200 inhabitants were massacred whom were mostly sadah or lords people who claimed they're Hashemites . Al-Mutahhar continued the anti-Ottoman struggle in the highlands. As for al-Mutwakkil Yahya Sharaf ad-Din, although deprived of power, he retained much influence within the Zaidi community. His attitude to the encroaching Turks was ambivalent. The old imam died in 1555 in Zafir.

See also

 Imams of Yemen
 Rassids

References

1473 births
1555 deaths
Zaydi imams of Yemen
16th century in Yemen
16th-century Arabs